Alagappan is a surname. Notable people with the surname include:

Alagappa Alagappan (1925–2014), Indian-born American founder of the Hindu Temple Society of North America
Arun Alagappan, American businessman
Muthu Alagappan (born  1990), British doctor